Learning for life and work is a subject taught in secondary schools in Northern Ireland.

Key Stage 3
The curriculum at Key Stage 3 covers:
 employability, 
 home economics, 
 local and global citizenship
 personal development. 
It is a compulsory subject but not a subject title. Schools are free to deliver the four strands in ways that suit their students.

Key Stage 4 
There remains a statutory requirement to cover key topics:
Employability
Personal development
Local and global citizenship  
The school may decide how to deliver the content.

A GCSE is offered with the title Learning for life and work (2017) It is modular and work covers the following areas:
Unit 1: Local and global citizenship (diversity and inclusion, government and politics, human rights)
Unit 2: Personal development (physical health, mental health, sexual health, parenting, personal finance)
Unit 3: Employability (globalisation, recruitment, employment rights, careers)
Unit 4: Investigation (an in-depth study on a topic from Units 1-3)

There is an entry level certificate available too.Entry Level Learning for Life and Work (2015)  It contains nine modules:
Local and Global Citizenship
    Unit 1: Learning to Live Together
     Unit 2: My Rights and Being Responsible
Personal Development
     Unit 3: Developing My Self-Management Skills
     Unit 4: Getting to Know Myself
     Unit 5: Travelling in My Community

Employability
    Unit 6: Workplace learning
     Unit 7: Applying for Jobs and Courses
     Unit 8: Planning My Business
    Unit 9: Making My Business Work.

References

External links
 Northern Ireland Curriculum KS3: Learning for life and work
 Northern Ireland Curriculum KS4: Learning for life and work

Education by subject
Education in Northern Ireland